The William Hovell Dam is a rock and earth-fill embankment dam with a flip bucket chute spillway across the King River, located in the Hume region of Victoria, Australia. The purposes of the dam are for irrigation and the generation of hydroelectricity. The impounded reservoir is called Lake William Hovell

The dam and reservoir are named in honour of William Hovell, an explorer.

Location and features
The dam is located south of Whitfield on the edge of the Alpine National Park, fed by the King River and Evans Creek.

The dam is managed by Goulburn-Murray Water.

See also

List of dams in Victoria

References

External links

Lakes of Victoria (Australia)
North-East catchment
Rivers of Hume (region)
Rock-filled dams
Earth-filled dams
Embankment dams
1973 establishments in Australia
Dams in Victoria (Australia)
Dams completed in 1973
Hydroelectric power stations in Victoria (Australia)